Juan Carlos Hurtado Miller (born 16 November 1940) is a Peruvian former engineer and Fujimorist politician who served in the cabinet during the presidency of  Fernando Belaúnde Terry and Alberto Fujimori in which, he served as Fujimori's first Prime Minister of Peru from 1990 to 1991 and was the Minister of Agriculture during the presidency of Fernando Belaúnde Terry between 1983 and 1985.

Early life and education 

Juan Carlos Hurtado was born on 16 November 1940 in Lima. His parents were former Minister of Health Alberto Hurtado Abadía and Lily Miller Maertens. He is the first cousin of former First Lady Violeta Correa Miller, wife of President Fernando Belaúnde Terry and daughter of former Foreign Minister Javier Correa Elías as well as a relative of Augusto Blacker Miller.

He completed his school studies at the Colegio Sagrados Corazones Recoleta.

He entered the National Agrarian University La Molina, where he studied agricultural engineering. He received a master's degree in Agricultural Economics at the University of Iowa. He also received a master's degree in public administration at the John F. Kennedy School of Government at Harvard University. He was an assistant researcher at the Harvard Institute for International Development.

He was coordinator of the Fondo de Financiamiento de Estudios de Proyectos de Inversión (FINEPI).

He married Leonor de Asín Puyo.

Political career 

He worked as an agricultural programmer for the National Planning Institute.

In the Second Government of President Fernando Belaúnde Terry he was chairman of the board of the Banco Agrario del Perú, director of the Central Reserve Bank of Peru, president of the Corporación Financiera de Desarrollo (COFIDE).

He was a member of the board of directors of Banco Industrial del Perú.

On 4 August 1983, he was appointed as Minister of Agriculture by President Fernando Belaúnde Terry. During his tenure as minister, the creation of CERTEX for non-traditional exports was approved. He remained in office until the end of the government in 1985.

On 28 July 1990, newly elected President Alberto Fujimori appointed him as Prime Minister of Peru and also at the same time as Minister of Economy and Finance.

As minister he was in charge of the announcement of the "Fujishock", a measure that proposed a restructuring of prices to control inflation. He resigned from office in February 1991 following the publication of an alternative economic stabilization program, the continuing failure to fight inflation and the crisis caused by a cholera epidemic.

He ran for mayor of Lima in the 1998 local elections under the Vamos Vecino party, losing to Alberto Andrade, who was re-elected for a second term.

On 13 October 1999, he returned to the Fujimori government as Minister of Industry, Tourism, Integration and International Trade Negotiations. He remained in the ministry until 28 July 2000.

He was accused of receiving funds for his electoral campaign from Intelligence chief Vladimiro Montesinos, for which he went into hiding in 2000. The delivery of these funds is documented in a vladi-videos secretly filmed by Vladimiro Montesinos. Surprisingly, he was handed over to justice on 13 April 2011.

References 

1940 births
Living people
National Agrarian University alumni
Harvard Kennedy School alumni
University of Iowa alumni
Fujimorista politicians
Popular Action (Peru) politicians
People from Lima
Prime Ministers of Peru
Ministers of Agriculture of Peru
Economy ministers of Peru
Finance ministers of Peru
Industry ministers of Peru
Trade ministers of Peru
Tourism ministers of Peru